Pasadena is a city in the U.S. state of Texas, within the  metropolitan area. As of the 2020 U.S. census, the city's population was 151,950, making it the twentieth most populous city in the state of Texas, as well as the second-largest city in Harris County. The area was founded in 1893 by John H. Burnett of Galveston, who named the area after Pasadena, California, because of the perceived lush vegetation.

History

Early history
Prior to European settlement the area around Galveston Bay was settled by the Karankawa and Atakapan tribes, particularly the Akokisa, who lived throughout the Gulf coast region. Spanish explorers such as the Rivas-Iriarte expedition and José Antonio de Evia charted the bay and gave it its name. The pirate Jean Lafitte established a short-lived kingdom based in Galveston in the early 19th century with bases and hide-outs around the bay and around Clear Lake. Lafitte was forced to leave in 1821 by the U.S. Navy.

Following its declaration of independence from Spain the new nation of Mexico moved to colonize its northern territory of Texas by offering land grants to settlers both from within Mexico and from the nearby United States. The colony established by Stephen F. Austin and the Galveston Bay and Texas Land Company of New York rapidly began a wave of settlement around the bay. Following a coup in the Mexican government by General Antonio Lopez de Santa Anna, Texas revolted against Mexican rule in 1835. After several battles and skirmishes the final battle of the Texas Revolution took place near modern Pasadena on April 21, 1836. While the main battlefield was located in the neighboring present-day city of La Porte, Santa Anna was captured in present-day Pasadena at Vince's Bayou. Because this was the last conflict that led to the Mexican surrender, Pasadena and neighboring Deer Park have adopted the nickname "Birthplace of Texas".

Ranching and settlement
This became the Allen Ranch which occupied what is now western Pasadena all the way to Harrisburg, Texas. By 1888, the ranch contained  in Harris County,  in Brazoria County, Texas with grazing lands in Galveston and Fort Bend Counties.

The Galveston, Houston & Henderson Railroad ran through the Allen ranch. There was a problem of cattle being regularly killed on the tracks and in 1875, Allen built a  fence along the east side of the railway right of way to keep the cattle off the tracks. The fence ran from Harrisburg to League City and had four rails and a top rail wide enough to walk on. A gate was placed in the fence at the Harrisburg-Lynchburg Road with a large sign above instructing that it should be closed at all times. The area east of this railroad fence running from Buffalo Bayou to the tracks on Sims Bayou ran all the way to Galveston Bay. It contained  of grazing land for cattle.

"Proposed" towns in or near present-day Pasadena were set up but short lived and either abandoned or never even got off the ground.
In 1892 Colonel John H. Burnett of Galveston established an unnamed townsite on the Vince Survey just east of the Allen Ranch. Burnett was involved in both construction and promotion of railroads and knew their impact on the value of property. The land was sold in  lots. He had also established the nearby towns of Deepwater and Genoa, later to be incorporated into Pasadena and Houston.

20th century

The 1900 hurricane that destroyed Galveston heavily damaged Pasadena, as well. The city received a population boost from some Galveston refugees who relocated to the mainland following the catastrophe. Donations by the newly created Red Cross, including millions of strawberry plants to Gulf Coast farmers, helped revive the community. This and the subsequent establishment of a major strawberry farm in the area by Texaco founder Joseph S. Cullinan made Pasadena a major fruit producer for many years afterward. As the community recovered major tracts of the Allen Ranch were liquidated opening up new development. Rice farmers from Japan settled in the community further diversifying its agriculture. Champion Coated Paper Company of Ohio opened a paper mill in 1937. Other businesses began to develop.

In 1901 the Texas Oil Boom began with the gusher at Spindletop. The discovery of the oil field at Goose Creek led to increasing petroleum exploration around Galveston Bay. By 1917–1920 refinery operations had appeared in Pasadena and continued to expand thereafter for example the Pasadena Refining System... The world wars gradually brought further industrial development, with Pasadena's growth rate surpassing even neighboring Houston.

Pasadena voted to incorporate in 1923, but residents decided to cancel the incorporation one year later. Pasadena incorporated in 1928. Because of the 1928 incorporation, Houston did not incorporate Pasadena's territory into its city limits, while Houston annexed surrounding areas that were unincorporated.

By the mid-20th century Pasadena's economy had become strongly tied to petroleum and other heavy industry. NASA's Johnson Space Center (JSC) was established near Pasadena in 1963 with the residential community of Clear Lake City, partially under Pasadena's jurisdiction, established nearby. These developments helped to diversify the town's economy significantly. Eventually, the city gained the unofficial moniker Stinkadena by locals due to the pollution from its large industrial base.

Former Pasadena City Council member and State Representative Ray Barnhart described the city at the time as "a lovely community but politically corrupt." Barnhart recalled that a half dozen Pasadena officials were indicted in the late 1950s and early 1960s for public corruption.

In 1965, Houston Post reporter Gene Goltz Received the Pulitzer Prize for his exposure of government corruption in Pasadena, Texas, which resulted in widespread reforms.

21st century

In the 21st century, Pasadena emerged as a mostly working-class suburb of Houston.

Tornadoes

2015 tornado

On October 31, 2015, an EF2 tornado struck a warehouse within Pasadena city limits. Half of the warehouse was completely leveled with its roof completely mangled up. The tornado moved northeast into La Porte city limits and damaged approximately 30 homes.

2023 tornado

On January 24, 2023, an EF3 tornado struck northwestern Pasadena. Multiple neighborhoods and apartment complexes were severely damaged by the tornado. No major casualties occurred with this tornado. The tornado would go on to affect Deer Park, and Baytown, Texas.

Geography

The city is bordered by the Houston Ship Channel (Buffalo Bayou / San Jacinto River) to the north. The southeasternmost part of the city fronts Galveston Bay.

Climate

The climate in this area is characterized by hot, humid summers and generally mild to cool winters.

Neighborhoods

Neighborhoods in Pasadena include:

Demographics

As of the 2020 United States census, there were 151,950 people, 48,174 households, and 36,201 families residing in the city. As of the census of 2010, there were 149,043 people. There were 54,712 housing units.

According to the 2010 census, the racial and ethnic makeup of the city was 83.3% White, 2.7% African American, 1.5% American Indian and Alaska Native, 2.1% Asian, 11.6% from other races, and 1.9% from two or more races. Hispanic or Latino of any race were 66.2% of the population. In 2020, the racial and ethnic makeup was 24.57% non-Hispanic white, 3.29% African American, 0.17% Native American, 2.2% Asian, 0.04% Pacific Islander, 0.31% some other race, 1.61% multiracial, and 67.81% Hispanic or Latino of any race.

Economy
The city's key economic sectors include exploration for petroleum and gas, petroleum refining, petrochemical processing, solar panel manufacturing, maritime shipping, aerospace, and healthcare. The city's economy is closely linked to the nearby Houston Ship Channel and the Bayport shipping terminal and industrial district, as well as the National Aeronautics and Space Administration (NASA)'s Lyndon B. Johnson Space Center in the bordering Clear Lake Area. The Pasadena Refining System, a partnership of Petrobras and Astra Holding USA, is headquartered in Pasadena.

Additionally, Harris County operates the Kyle Chapman/Pasadena Courthouse Annex. Harris Health System (formerly Harris County Hospital District) operates the Strawberry Health Center, and the Pediatric and Adolescent Health Center – Pasadena. The nearest public hospital is Ben Taub General Hospital in the Texas Medical Center, Houston. The Texas Department of Criminal Justice (TDCJ) operates the Houston V District Parole Office in Pasadena.

There are four post offices in the city limits. In July 2011 the USPS announced that one, John Foster Post Office, may close.

Top employers
According to the city's 2017 Comprehensive Annual Financial Report, the top employers in the city are:

Government

The government of Pasadena operates under a mayor-council form of government with a mayor and eight council members who are responsible for enacting legislation, adopting budgets and setting policies.

Public safety
The city has its own police department, which employs approximately 282 Officers, with one Police Chief, three Assistant Chiefs and other supervisory positions. The Pasadena Volunteer Fire Department is the largest of all volunteer municipal fire departments in the United States.

Culture

The city has several museums, including the Pasadena Historical Museum, the Bay Area Museum and Armand Bayou Nature Center. Pasadena also has a community theater, an annual rodeo, and the Pasadena Philharmonic. The city's newspaper is the Pasadena Citizen.

The Champion paper mill closed in 2005. Several country music songs have been recorded with "Pasa-get-down-dena" as the title including Kenefick on their album "Hard Road."

Gilley's and Urban Cowboy
John Travolta, Debra Winger and other actors came to the city to film the 1980 hit movie Urban Cowboy, which depicted life and young love in Pasadena. The film centered on the city's honky-tonk bar Gilley's, which was co-owned by country music star Mickey Gilley. In 1989, Gilley's suffered an arson fire that gutted the interior of the building, including the mechanical bull used in Urban Cowboy. The shell of the building stood until 2006, when it was demolished by the Pasadena Independent School District, its current owner. Only the old sound recording studio remains. Gilley resided in Pasadena until his death May 7, 2022. The old address of Gilley's is a used-car lot.

Strawberry Festival

In 1900, Clara Barton of the American Red Cross purchased 1.5 million strawberry plants and sent them to Pasadena to help victims of the 1900 Galveston hurricane get back on their feet. By the 1930s those crops had flourished so much that Pasadena was claiming the title of Strawberry Capital of the World. At its height, the city's strawberry growers shipped as many as 28 train carloads of strawberries each day. To honor that history, the city still holds an annual Pasadena Strawberry Festival. Strawberry Road stretches through much of the city near where the old strawberry crops grew. Attendance at the annual Strawberry Festival was 56,000 in 2008.

Pasadena Philharmonic Society and Orchestra
Pasadena Philharmonic Society and Orchestra is a combination of two groups. The Society is composed of members of the local community that support the fine arts and classical music. The Orchestra is composed of local music educators, musicians, college students and selected high school students. The Orchestra presented its first performance in the fall of 1982. The Philharmonic has presented performances ever since.

Education

Primary and secondary schools
Most of city of Pasadena is served by the Pasadena Independent School District. Some of the eastern part is served by Deer Park Independent School District, some of the southern part is served by Clear Creek Independent School District and La Porte Independent School District.

The Roman Catholic Archdiocese of Galveston-Houston operated the St. Pius V School in Pasadena from 1947, until its 2020 closure; the COVID-19 pandemic contributed to the closure.

Colleges and universities

Institutions of higher education include:
University of Houston–Clear Lake 
San Jacinto College (Central Campus and System Headquarters) a community college system which under Texas law serves all of Pasadena ISD, La Porte ISD, and Deer Park ISD, as well as other school districts, and the portion of Clear Creek ISD in Harris County; this means in effect it serves all of the City of Pasadena.

Texas Chiropractic College

Public libraries
Pasadena owns the Pasadena Public Library with the Main Library at 1201 Jeff Ginn Memorial Drive and the Fairmont Library, a branch, at 4330 Fairmont Parkway between Panama Street and Watters Road.

Parks and recreation
The city operates 15 tennis courts, several baseball fields, and a total of 43 parks total. These include
four Youth Recreation Centers,
the Verne Cox Multipurpose Recreation Center,
three pools for Swimming or Aquatics,
an Athletics department,
a Dog Park,
Party Rentals,
a Golf Course,
an Historical Museum,
and a Senior Citizen Center.

Harris County operates several community centers in Pasadena.
  East Harris County Activity Center
 Bay Area Community Center
 Clear Lake Water Front (Pasadena Section)

Local residents have access to tennis courts, soccer fields, jogging tracks, walking tracks, picnic tables, family gathering pavilions at Pasadena's 47 parks, 5 swimming pools, and 5 game room buildings, museum, recreation center, 15 tennis courts and 21 ball fields.

Armand Bayou Nature Center
Armand Bayou Nature Center (ABNC) is a  preserve on the western shore of Galveston Bay in Pasadena. It is the only remnant of this region's original eco-systems: coastal tallgrass prairie, bottomland forest and bayou. A diversity of plant life has taken root here, including bottomland hardwoods. Hundreds of species of wildlife thrive in the narrow wooded streams and scattered lakes, ponds and marshes. Armand Bayou also is a breeding and nursery ground for many finfish and shellfish and a haven for rarely seen species such as bobcats and owls.

 ABNC has been designated as one of five preserves under the Texas Coastal Preserve Program of the Texas Parks and Wildlife Department.

Infrastructure

Transportation

Pasadena is served by three freeway systems. Interstate 45 is the closest interstate to the Pasadena city limits. The main freeway artery is the Pasadena Freeway (State Highway 225). The east side of the Sam Houston Tollway (Beltway 8) runs through the eastern portion of the city.

The Harris County Toll Road Authority sells EZ Tags in the city.

Public transportation
Metropolitan Transit Authority of Harris County, Texas (METRO) operates a park & ride service from the Plaza Paseo Mall.
This joint venture between Harris County, the city of Pasadena and METRO extended select trips. METRO operates four trips during the morning and five trips during the afternoon rush hours. Harris County Transit operates a bus route that runs through most of the city, stopping at health centers, shopping centers, colleges, and other venues, with connections to neighboring cites. The Pasadena Park and Ride lot is located on the north side of the mall.

County services
Harris County Youth Village, a juvenile detention facility, is located in far southern Pasadena, but it has a Seabrook postal address.

Notable people

 Ray Barnhart, former member of the Texas House of Representatives from Pasadena, later director of the Federal Highway Administration
 Emily Chan, figure skater, 2016 junior national champion
 Dean Corll, serial killer, rapist, kidnapper and torturer, died in Pasadena
 Brandon Darby, political activist
 Marlen Esparza, Olympic competitor 2012 and bronze medalist in women's boxing
 Mickey Gilley, world-famous country singer and part-owner of Gilley's night club in Pasadena, used for filming of Urban Cowboy
 Jacob Green, All American football player for Texas A&M, played for Seattle Seahawks
 Russell Harvard, actor, There Will Be Blood, Fargo
 Gilbert Pena, 2015 Republican member of Texas House of Representatives from Pasadena
 Robert Talton, member of Texas House of Representatives from District 144 in Pasadena, 1993–2009; candidate for Chief Justice of the Texas Supreme Court in 2014 Republican primary election
 Sharon Tate, actress. Attended South Shaver Elementary, St. Pius Catholic Church, and briefly Pasadena High School.

Sister city
The city of Pasadena, community police outreach has devoted "friendship gardens" to the city of Hadano.

See also

 Allen Ranch
 Galveston Bay Area

Notes

References

External links
City of Pasadena
Pasadena Texas Community Information
Pasadena Chamber of Commerce

 
Texas
Cities in Texas
Cities in Harris County, Texas